Miracle Man is a Marvel Comics character and one of the Fantastic Four's earlier villains.

Miracle Man may also refer to:

Film
The Miracle Man (1919 film), a 1919 lost film, featuring Lon Chaney
The Miracle Man (1932 film), a 1932 remake of the 1919 film, featuring Boris Karloff
Znachor (1937 film), (The Miracle Man), a 1937 Polish drama film

Music
"Miracle Man", a song by Elvis Costello from his 1977 album My Aim Is True
"Miracle Man", a song by Ozzy Osbourne from his 1988 album No Rest for the Wicked
"Miracle Man", a song by Capital Lights from their 2008 album This Is an Outrage!
"Miracle Man", a song by Oliver Tree from his 2020 album Ugly Is Beautiful

Other uses
Miracleman (character), the current name of Marvelman, a British superhero created by Mick Anglo
Miracle Man (superhero), a similar British superhero also created by Anglo
"Miracle Man" (The X-Files), an episode of The X-Files
The Miracle Man (play), a 1914 Broadway play by George M. Cohan from which the film versions are based
George Stallings, an American baseball manager

See also
Man of Miracles (disambiguation)
Miracle (disambiguation)
Hadji Ali, a vaudeville performer known as The Great Egyptian Miracle Man